Jo-Wilfried Tsonga was the defending champion, but withdrew before the tournament began with a left hamstring injury.

Roger Federer regained the ATP No. 1 singles ranking by reaching the semifinals and went on to win his third title in Rotterdam, defeating Grigor Dimitrov in the final, 6–2, 6–2.

Seeds

Draw

Finals

Top half

Bottom half

Qualifying

Seeds

Qualifiers

Lucky losers

Qualifying draw

First qualifier

Second qualifier

Third qualifier

Fourth qualifier

References

External links
 Main draw
 Qualifying draw

Singles